Jill Kelley (born June 3, 1975) is a Lebanese-American philanthropist, activist, and diplomatic advisor. She is also a former South Korean Honorary Consul, and a former honorary ambassador to U.S. Central Command under General James N. Mattis.

Kelley is president and founder of Military Diplomacy Strategies, an international advisory firm that advises embassies and multi-national companies to foster military, security and economic relationships. She is also the founder of a blockchain company, holds two patents, one biomedical and blockchain, and is on the board of several public companies. In 2021, Kelley was appointed Executive Director of an Australian rare-earth company, to increase their North American presence.

Early life and marriage 
Kelley was born Jill Gilberte Khawam on June 3, 1975 in Beirut, Lebanon. She immigrated to the United States with her Maronite Catholic parents in the mid-1970s. The family consists of Kelley, her two sisters a brother.

Kelley lived in the Philadelphia, PA area until her mid-20s. Following high school, she studied to become a doctor and was a medical researcher at the University of Pennsylvania. In 1999, Kelley married cancer-surgeon Scott Kelley. Following their marriage, the couple moved to Tampa and had three children.

Public life 
While in Tampa, Kelley served as a volunteer social-liaison to MacDill Air Force Base. The couple has hosted numerous events for military leaders at their home near the United States Central Command. Her husband Scott Kelley says he and his wife feel an obligation to share their good fortune by showing support for the military.

In 2011, Kelley received the Joint Chiefs of Staff Outstanding Public Service Award.

In 2012, Kelley was an honorary ambassador to U.S. Central Command under General James N. Mattis, then-commander of U.S. military forces in the Middle East.

In 2012, Kelley was named Honorary Consul for the Republic of Korea. Due to her connections with both U.S. military personnel and South Korean businesses, she was removed from the position later that year. Kelley believes she was inappropriately removed from the post because she was a key figure in the Petraeus-Broadwell scandal.

Kelley was an honorary social ambassador to the MacDill Air Force Base military community, as well as honorary ambassador to Central Command commander Jim Mattis and Central Intelligence Agency director David Petraeus.

In 2018, Kelley and a senior advisor to the president met with the Polish government to set up a U.S. military base in Poland, to be paid for by Poland, to improve their national security and relations with the U.S. military and the United States.

From 2015 to 2017, Kelley and her neighbor Joe Maddon, former Chicago Cubs manager and current Los Angeles Angels General Manager, cohosted and held Gasparilla parties that aimed to benefit disabled veterans. These events were hosted at her mansion, and had many other celebrities and athletes in attendance.

Philanthropic activity 

The Kelley's have held numerous charitable volunteering and fundraising events with organizations such as the American Red Cross, the National Gallery of Art, the Wounded Warrior Project, and Heart for the Homeless. 

In 2014, Kelley and her uncle (who is a Syrian Catholic leader) met with Pope Francis to discuss the persecution of Catholics in the Middle East.  Kelley learned of a Pakistani Catholic couple who were burned alive by a mob, and she purchased a home in the United States for their orphaned children.

From 2015 to 2017, Kelley and her neighbor—then Chicago Cubs manager Joe Maddon—cohosted Gasparilla parties to benefit disabled veterans.

In April 2020, Kelley's husband Dr Scott Kelley, setup a free nationwide Covid-19 hotline, a public service to offer free COVID test and medical evaluation to all Americans.  During the height of the Covid-19 pandemic, the Kelleys funded a free hotline to serve marginalized and economically challenged communities. In this effort, the Kelleys partners weigh longtime friend, NFL quarterback Jameis Winston. Together they set up the hotline, which used artificial intelligence (AI) and analytics to deliver free test kits and/or telemedicine appointments to patients in need. 

In 2021, Kelley assisted in the evacuation of hundreds of Afghans from their country when the Taliban seized power.  Kelley, whose Catholic family immigrated to the US to escape religious persecution in Lebanon, continues to work through her diplomatic ties to extract more Afghan refugees from danger zones. Kelley has been referred to as "a diplomatic fixer". Kelley also provided support to rescue LGBTQ Afghans and resettle them in Canada and has noted the special risks of these marginalized groups in remaining in Taliban-controlled Afghanistan.

The Kelleys are patrons of the Oxford Philharmonic.

The Kelleys have twice offered their Nantucket home to POTUS and/or FLOTUS security staff:  first during President Biden's Thanksgiving visit to Nantucket, followed by Jill Biden's July 2022 visit to Nantucket. Nantucket's "N Magazine" stated "With no vacancy at any of Nantucket's inns or hotels tonight, the visiting security for @flotus Jill Biden are staying at the Baxter Road home of Scott and Jill Kelley".

Petraeus scandal 

In June, 2012, Kelley contacted the FBI and later filed a report that she received multiple anonymous harassing e-mails that appeared to be an attempt to blackmail General David Petraeus. The FBI's investigation led to the discovery of CIA Director General David Petraeus's extramarital affair with Paula Broadwell who was Petraeus's biographer at the time.  The FBI determined that Paula Broadwell was responsible for stalking Kelley and was the source of the threatening emails.

During the course of the investigation, government officials disclosed Kelley's name as the victim to the Washington Post, along with the evidentiary emails she provided to the FBI.  The accusations sparked an investigation by the Department of Defense, which they eventually refused to investigate further. The accusations stated by government officials and the media made Kelley a near-daily feature during the scandal. On November 6, 2013 Kelley penned an Op-Ed in the Wall Street Journal warning against government surveillance and describing herself as the "human face" of the damage that can be caused by government probing into Americans' personal communications.

On June 3, 2013, Kelley filed a privacy lawsuit against the federal government alleging that investigators violated her privacy rights by unlawfully searching her personal emails and disclosing false descriptions of the nature of them to the media. In addition, she stated "false and untrue headlines created a media sideshow" at her expense, including her being wrongfully implicated in the extramarital affair between Petraeus and Broadwell. Kelley has become an advocate for internet privacy and security.

Privacy advocacy 
In 2014, Kelley received the support of two U.S. Congressmen to advocate for stronger privacy rights using her story of privacy rights violations related to the Petraeus scandal to "bring awareness to the damages that can be caused by government overreach and unwarranted searches of emails."  Kelley published a memoir in 2014, titled Collateral Damage: Petraeus, Power, Politics and the Abuse of Privacy.

In 2016, Kelley spoke at a Yale University undergraduate event on the topics of privacy rights and Internet security, along with reform and stronger protection of electronic communications.  The New York Times alluded to Jill Kelley as "an apostle for privacy."

External links 
 JillKelley.com – personal website
 Military Diplomatic Strategies – Military Diplomatic Strategies
 Jill Kelley on Twitter

References 

1975 births
American socialites
Lebanese socialites
Lebanese emigrants to the United States
Living people
Lebanese Maronites
People from Beirut
People from Tampa, Florida
People from Voorhees Township, New Jersey
Petraeus scandal
American twins
Privacy activists